Kornél Kulcsár (born 11 November 1991) is a Hungarian football player who plays for Romanian club Târgu Mureș.

Club statistics

Updated to games played as of 15 May 2021.

References
Player profile at HLSZ 

1991 births
People from Nagyatád
Sportspeople from Somogy County
Living people
Hungarian footballers
Association football midfielders
Kaposvári Rákóczi FC players
Szombathelyi Haladás footballers
Zalaegerszegi TE players
Lombard-Pápa TFC footballers
Mezőkövesdi SE footballers
Kisvárda FC players
Győri ETO FC players
Soproni VSE players
Mosonmagyaróvári TE 1904 footballers
Budafoki LC footballers
Kozármisleny SE footballers
ASA Târgu Mureș (1962) players
Nemzeti Bajnokság I players
Nemzeti Bajnokság II players
Hungarian expatriate footballers
Expatriate footballers in Romania
Hungarian expatriate sportspeople in Romania